Artistic swimming (formally synchronized swimming) at the 2019 World Aquatics Championships was held between 12 and 20 July 2019.

Schedule
Ten events were held.

All time are local (UTC+9).

Medal summary

Medal table

Medal events

References

External links
Official website

 
Artistic swimming
Synchronised swimming at the World Aquatics Championships
2019 in synchronized swimming
Synchronized swimming in South Korea